Fisher Museum may refer to:
 USC Fisher Museum of Art at the University of Southern California
 The Fisher Museum in the Harvard Forest in Petersham, Massachusetts
 Mel Fisher Maritime Heritage Museum in Key West, Florida
 Mel Fisher's Treasure Museum in Sebastian, Florida